Online Khabar is an independent private online news portal of Nepal established in 2006, providing news in Nepali and English languages. There is no print available from this media house. In 2014, it was one of the top 10 web news portal in Nepal. By 2020, it became the most viewed news portal from Nepal. The rise in online viewing of online newspapers including Online Khabar has been partially attributed to the Gorkha earthquake of 2015 during which the print media had stopped.

The news agency actively advocates free journalism by taking part against media censorship by the state. The journalist of the media has been attacked by police in some incidents. For instance, a photo journalist was attacked by a police while taking a photo of the arrest of a civil servant inside Singha Durbar.

Online Khabar bought Himalaya TV to provided converged content to Nepali audiences.

Arguments 
While reporting the Gorkha Earthquake, the news portal was criticized for portraying the event to be of much larger scale than the actual which caused cancellation of numerous bookings and flights to Nepal.
 In 2020, the Covid reporting was done by the news portal without any official confirmation.
It was reported that this portal heavily depends on the traditional media for its content.

References 

Nepali-language newspapers
2006 establishments in Nepal
Nepali-language websites